Bitch Betta Have My Money is the debut studio album by American rapper AMG. It was released on December 3, 1991, by Select Records. The album achieved gold record status, and the single "Bitch Betta Have My Money' sold in excess of a million copies.

Track listing

Charts

Weekly charts

Year-end charts

References

AMG (rapper) albums
1991 albums
Albums produced by Courtney Branch
Albums produced by DJ Quik
Select Records albums